The Lerbekk Formation is a geologic formation found in the Røragen Basin in Sør-Trøndelag, Norway. It preserves fossils dating back to the Devonian period.

See also

 List of fossiliferous stratigraphic units in Norway

References

 

Geologic formations of Norway
Devonian System of Europe
Devonian Norway
Devonian southern paleotropical deposits